Sunnyside School–Midway Baptist Church and Midway Cemetery Historic District is a historic district with a school and Baptist church building in Hamilton, Georgia. The school was built during 1920–1921, and the church was constructed in 1925.  The school has aspects of Bungalow/craftsman style.

The district was added to the National Register of Historic Places in 1999.

References

External links
 

Baptist churches in Georgia (U.S. state)
Churches on the National Register of Historic Places in Georgia (U.S. state)
Churches completed in 1921
Buildings and structures in Harris County, Georgia
Bungalow architecture in Georgia (U.S. state)
Historic districts on the National Register of Historic Places in Georgia (U.S. state)
Cemeteries on the National Register of Historic Places in Georgia (U.S. state)
National Register of Historic Places in Harris County, Georgia